Aspergillus cejpii is a species of fungus in the genus Aspergillus. It is from the Clavati section. The species was first described in 1975. Aspergillus cejpii produces gliotoxin, acetylgliotoxin G, fiscalin B and xanthocillin X.

Growth and morphology

A. cejpii has been cultivated on both Czapek yeast extract agar (CYA) plates and Malt Extract Agar Oxoid® (MEAOX) plates. The growth morphology of the colonies can be seen in the pictures below.

References

Further reading 
 

cejpii
Fungi described in 2014